The yellow-browed woodpecker (Piculus aurulentus), also known as the white-browed woodpecker, is a Near Threatened species of bird in subfamily Picinae of the woodpecker family Picidae. It is found in Argentina, Brazil, Paraguay, and Uruguay.

Taxonomy and systematics

Some authors treat the yellow-browed woodpecker and the golden-green woodpecker (P. chrysochloros) as a superspecies. The species is monotypic.

Description

Males and females have the same plumage except on their heads. Males are red from forehead to nape, have a narrow yellowish white supercilium, are dark olive green around the eye and onto the side of the neck, and successively below that a pale yellow stripe and a red malar band. Their chin and throat are pale golden. The female has an olive forehead and crown and much less red at the malar. Adults have olive green upperparts. Their flight feathers are dark brown with greenish edges and dark cinnamon-rufous on the inner webs. Their tail is blackish. Their underparts are whitish with wide dark olive bars. Their medium-length beak is blackish gray with a paler base on the mandible, their iris chestnut-brown, and the legs greenish gray. Juveniles are generally duller than adults and have less well defined barring on their underparts.

Distribution and habitat

The yellow-browed woodpecker is found from Brazil's São Paulo state south through eastern Paraguay and northern Uruguay into northeastern Argentina. It inhabits the interior and edges of humid mature montane forest, dense secondary forest and woodland, and humid lowland forest.

Behavior

Movement

As far as is known, the yellow-browed woodpecker is a year-round resident throughout its range.

Feeding

The yellow-browed woodpecker mostly forages in the forest's middle level, by itself or in pairs. It commonly feeds by gleaning and pecking to reach prey. Its diet has not been studied in detail but is known to include ants and their eggs.

Breeding

The yellow-browed woodpecker's breeding season is not well defined but appears to include August to November. It tends to excavate its nest cavity high in a tree.The clutch size, incubation period, time to fledging, and details of parental care are not known.

Vocal and non-vocal sounds

The yellow-browed woodpecker's song is a "slow or hurried series of 7-15 high 'wuh' notes." It drums with "rapid, regular rolls."

Status

The IUCN has assessed the yellow-browed woodpecker as Near Threatened. It has a somewhat restricted range and an unknown population size that is believed to be decreasing. Much of its original habitat has been cleared for cultivation and pasture and the conversion continues. "Rather uncommon; apparently shy in nature, and not often seen."

References

yellow-browed woodpecker
Birds of the Atlantic Forest
yellow-browed woodpecker
Taxonomy articles created by Polbot